Porter Hills is a set of hills in Antarctica named after Raymond C. Porter, Electronics Technician, USCG, a crewman of USCGC Glacier, who was killed in an offloading accident at McMurdo Station on February 8, 1979.

Hills of Victoria Land
Scott Coast